The National Baptist Convention of Mexico is a Baptist Christian denomination, affiliated with the Baptist World Alliance, in Mexico. The headquarters is in Mexico City, Mexico.

History
The first evangelical church in Mexico was a Baptist church organized on January 30, 1864 in Monterrey, Nuevo León. James Hickey, a Baptist and a member of the American Bible Society, constituted this church with himself and four other members – Thomas Westrup, José Maria Uranga, Arcadio Uranga, and Mrs. Hickey. By 1869, Westrup and the Uranga brothers had organized six more churches. The American Baptist Home Mission Society and the International Mission Board sent about fifty missionaries to Mexico before the beginning of the 20th century.   In 1884, the Coahuila Baptist Association was organized in Saltillo, and in 1885 the Nuevo León Baptist Association was organized in Monterrey. 

After the turn of the century, Alejandro Treviño, John Cheavens and James Chastain proposed the idea of organizing a national convention. Forty-three church messengers met at the Primera Iglesia Bautista (First Baptist Church) in Mexico City in September 1903.  From this gathering came a provisional constitution for the National Convention, and the groundwork for missionary, theological and publications ministries. This began a transition of the work from leadership by foreign missionaries to leadership by national pastors. In 1904, the National Convention selected Alejandro Treviño to represent them at the first Baptist World Congress, from which was formed the Baptist World Alliance.

The National Convention currently is engaged in missionary, theological, publication, and benevolent work, as well as carrying on work among the students in 3 large universities. It operates the Mexican Baptist Theological Seminary in Mexico City and the Dr. G. H. Lacy Seminary in Oaxaca, Oaxaca, and owns six bookstores. La Luz Bautista (The Baptist Light) is the official periodical of the Convention. In 1993, the Convention was able to gain official recognition through registration with the Office of Religious Affairs. In 2011, it has 1,800 churches and 70,000 members.

See also
 Bible
 Born again
 Baptist beliefs
 Worship service (evangelicalism)
 Jesus Christ
 Believers' Church

References

Sources
Baptists Around the World, by Albert W. Wardin, Jr.

External links
 Convención Nacional Bautista de México Home Page 

Baptist denominations established in the 20th century
Christian organizations established in 1903
Baptist denominations in North America
Baptist Christianity in Mexico
1903 establishments in Mexico